Sigma Alpha Epsilon was established at the University of Alabama on March 9, 1856, and has since grown to be an international fraternity. Following is a list of Sigma Alpha Epsilon chapters. Active chapters are indicated in bold. Inactive chapters are in italic.

Notes

References 

Lists of chapters of United States student societies by society
chapters